Peetaliya Balaji, also known as Balaji ka Nagla is a village in Mahwa town, Dausa district, Rajasthan, India.   It is just 2.9 km away from the Mahwa bypass. It is 70 km away from its district headquarters Dausa and 125 km from the state capital of Jaipur via National Highway 21.

Peetaliya Balaji is a part of Rout and mainly consists of five parts mainly, which are:
Beech ka nagla
Niche ka nagla (also known as Megha ka nagla)
Upar ka nagla (also known as Tundipura or Bhainsa ka nagla)
Moti ka nagla (mori wali basti) 
Nahar ka nagla.
Band ki basti.

Most of the people in the village Peetaliya Balaji are saini (also known as Mali or Gardeners).

There is a famous and old temple of (Hanuman ji) named as Mandir Peetaliya Balaji.

Editing by TRS BALAJI

References

Villages in Dausa district